Ramsey Reid Falconer, known as Reid Falconer (born December 26, 1956), is a former Republican member of the Louisiana House of Representatives for District 89 in St. Tammany Parish in suburban New Orleans, Louisiana. On January 11, 2016, he succeeded the term-limited Republican Representative Timothy Burns. In 2019, he ran for District 11 in the Louisiana State Senate, but lost to fellow Republican Patrick McMath.

In the October 24, 2015 primary election, Falconer, with 7,135 votes (66 percent), defeated another Republican candidate, Pat Phillips, who polled 3,683 votes (34 percent). Phillips had also unsuccessfully opposed Tim Burns in the 2011 primary.

2019 lawsuit 
Falconer is currently suing FanDroppings LLC, owners of the TigerDroppings website. Falconer is requesting information on the website's user posting allegedly fake information involving a criminal complaint at Southeastern University.

References

1956 births
Living people
People from St. Tammany Parish, Louisiana
Businesspeople from Louisiana
Republican Party members of the Louisiana House of Representatives
School board members in Louisiana
Louisiana State University alumni
21st-century American politicians